Busse is a surname. People with this surname include:

Andreas Busse (born 1959), East German (now German) former middle-distance runner
Carl Busse (architect) (1834-1896), German architect and master builder
Carl Hermann Busse (1872–1918), German lyric poet and literary critic
Erwin von Busse (1895–1939), German writer, artist, stage director 
Ewald W. Busse (1917–2004), American psychiatrist, gerontologist, author and academic administrator
Fred A. Busse (1866–1914), mayor of Chicago 1907–1911
Friedhelm Busse (1929–2008) German neo-Nazi politician and activist
Georg Heinrich Busse (1810–1868), German landscape painter and engraver
Heinrich Busse (1909–1998), highly decorated Oberst in the Wehrmacht during World War II
Henry Busse (1894–1955), German-born American jazz trumpeter
Hermann Eris Busse (1891–1947), German novelist and literary critic
Joachim Busse (born 1954), West German (now German) retired long jumper
Joachim von Busse (1893-1945), German World War I flying ace
Jochen Busse (born 1941), German television actor
Johannes von Busse (1862–1836), German military officer 
Laura Busse (born ), German neuroscientist
Martin Busse (born 1958), East German (now German) retired football midfielder
Otto Busse (1867–1922), German pathologist
Otto Busse (1901–1980), German resistance fighter
Ray Busse (born 1948), American Major League Baseball shortstop 1971–1974
Theodor Busse (1897–1986), German officer during World War I and World War II
Tomasz Busse (born 1956), Polish former wrestler
Walter Busse (born 1987), Argentine football midfielder
Walter Carl Otto Busse (1865–1933), German botanist
Wilhelm Busse (1915–1944), highly decorated Oberstleutnant in the Wehrmacht during World War II
Yuri Busse (born 2001), Russian artistic gymnast

See also
Buss, surname
Busse Woods, the common name of the Ned Brown Forest Preserve in northern Illinois
Busse Woods, the second full-length album by stoner metal band Acid King
Buss Island, also called Busse Island, a phantom island of the Age of Exploration
Bussey (disambiguation)